Athletics was one of the sports at the Central African Games, and featured on the programme at all three editions of the competition, in 1976, 1981 and 1987.

Editions

References

 
Central African Games
Central African Games
Athletics